This is a season-by-season list of records compiled by Cornell in men's ice hockey.

Cornell University has won two NCAA national titles, and is the only Division I national champion to complete a season undefeated, doing so in 1970.

Season-by-season results

Note: GP = Games played, W = Wins, L = Losses, T = Ties

* Winning percentage is used when conference schedules are unbalanced.The Ivy League is an unofficial ice hockey conference.

Footnotes

References

 
Lists of college men's ice hockey seasons in the United States
Cornell Big Red ice hockey seasons